Qianxinan Buyei and Miao Autonomous Prefecture (Buyei: Qianfxiynanf Buxqyaix Buxyeeuz Ziqziqzouy; Hmu: Qeef Xib Naif Dol Yat Dol Hmub Zid Zid Zeb), is an autonomous prefecture of Guizhou province, People's Republic of China, bordering Guangxi to the south and Yunnan to the west. The name, "" derives from the prefecture's southwest location in the province; "" is the official abbreviation for Guizhou, while "" means "southwest".

Subdivisions

The prefecture is subdivided into 8 county-level divisions: 2 county-level cities and 6 counties.
County level cities:
Xingyi
Xingren
Counties:
Wangmo County
Pu'an County
Ceheng County
Qinglong County
Zhenfeng County
Anlong County

References 

 
Prefecture-level divisions of Guizhou
Autonomous prefectures of the People's Republic of China
Xingyi, Guizhou
Bouyei people
Miao people
Miao autonomous prefectures